Deming is a Chinese given name. Notable people with the name include:

 Li Deming (981–1032), founder of the Tangut state
 Chen Deming (born 1949), Chinese/Taiwanese official
 Sun Deming, the birth name of Chinese statesman Sun Yat-sen (1866–1925)

Chinese given names